Maxim Tissot (born April 13, 1992) is a Canadian professional soccer player who plays as a left-back for Atlético Ottawa.

Club career

Montreal Impact
Born in Gatineau, Quebec and a product of the Montreal Impact Academy in the Canadian Soccer League, Tissot signed a professional contract with the Montreal Impact of Major League Soccer on February 26, 2013. Tissot then made his debut for the club on April 14, 2013, one day after his 21st birthday, against the Columbus Crew in which he came on in the 88th minute for Marco Di Vaio as the Impact drew the match 1–1. He then scored his first ever professional goal of his career on September 23, 2013 against the Chicago Fire in which he found the net in the 87th minute to tie up the score in a 2–2 match. Tissot was waived by the Impact on June 28, 2016 to sign David Choinière to an MLS contract.

Ottawa Fury
On July 14, 2016, Tissot signed with Ottawa Fury FC of the North American Soccer League. In December 2016, the Fury announced that Tissot would not return to the team as the club moved to USL in 2017.

D.C. United
On February 24, 2017, Tissot signed with D.C. United. He had his first start for United against the New England Revolution on April 22, 2017. Tissot was released from the team on May 8, 2017.

San Francisco Deltas
A day after being released by DC United, Tissot signed with San Francisco Deltas in the North American Soccer League. Tissot would win the 2017 Soccer Bowl with the Deltas in their inaugural season. The Deltas would cease operations three days after winning the Soccer Bowl, leaving Tissot to look for a new club.

Return to Ottawa
On January 10, 2018, Tissot returned to USL side Ottawa Fury FC for the 2018 season. Tissot would miss the bulk of the 2018 season due to multiple knee injuries. After the 2018 season, the Fury would announce that Tissot would return to the Fury for the 2019 season. After two seasons with the Fury, the club would cease operations for the 2020 season, making Tissot a free agent.

Forge FC
On July 22, 2020, Tissot signed with reigning Canadian Premier League champions Forge FC. He made his debut for The Hammers as a substitute on August 13 in the 2020 season opener against Cavalry FC.

Atlético Ottawa
On January 26, 2022, Tissot returned to Ottawa, signing a one-year contract with an option for 2023 with Atlético Ottawa.

International career
Tissot received his first call up to Canada on November 6, 2014, for a friendly against Panama. Prior to this, he had no experience with the Canadian national team program at any level. He, however, did not make an appearance during the match. Tissot would make his debut on January 16, 2015, in a friendly against Iceland.

Career statistics

Club

International

Honours
Montreal Impact
Canadian Championship (2): 2013, 2014

Montreal Impact Academy
Canadian Soccer League Defender of the Year: 2012

Forge FC 

 Canadian Premier League: 2020

Atlético Ottawa 

 Canadian Premier League
Regular Season: 2022

References

External links
 
 Montreal Impact profile

1992 births
Living people
Association football defenders
Canadian soccer players
Soccer people from Quebec
Sportspeople from Gatineau
Canadian expatriate soccer players
Expatriate soccer players in the United States
Canadian expatriate sportspeople in the United States
Trois-Rivières Attak players
CF Montréal players
Montreal Impact U23 players
FC Montreal players
Ottawa Fury FC players
D.C. United players
Richmond Kickers players
San Francisco Deltas players
Forge FC players
Atlético Ottawa players
Canadian Soccer League (1998–present) players
Major League Soccer players
USL Championship players
North American Soccer League players
Canadian Premier League players
Canada men's international soccer players
2015 CONCACAF Gold Cup players
Homegrown Players (MLS)